David O'Hare and Joe Salisbury were the defending champions but chose to defend their title with different partners. O'Hare partnered Luke Bambridge but lost in the final to Dominik Köpfer and Denis Kudla. Salisbury partnered Brydan Klein but lost in the semifinals to Bambridge and O'Hare.

Köpfer and Kudla won the title after defeating Bambridge and O'Hare 7–6(8–6), 7–6(7–3) in the final.

Seeds

Draw

References
 Main Draw

Columbus Challenger - Doubles
Columbus Challenger